Robert Hugh Rose (January 24, 1876 – August 15, 1960) was an American dietitian, physician and writer.

Rose was born at Carthage, Missouri. Rose graduated from DePauw University in 1898. He obtained his M.D. from College of Physicians and Surgeons, New York in 1902. He practiced medicine in New York City.

Rose was the first to advocate counting calories as a method to lose weight. He proposed this in his book Eat Your Way to Health, published in 1916. In the second edition he described the method as a "scientific system of weight control". Rose proposed the counting calories method for weight loss two years before Lulu Hunt Peters famous Diet & Health: With Key to the Calories.

Rose's book Eat Your Way to Health was positively reviewed in medical journals.

Rose died on August 15, 1960.

Selected publications

The Maintenance Diet for Adults (New York Medical Journal, 1915)
Weight Increase (New York Medical Journal, 1915)
Weight Reduction (New York Medical Journal, 1915) 
Eat Your Way To Health (1916, 1924)
Weight, Diet and Efficiency (New York Medical Journal, 1920)
Acid Gastritis (New York Medical Journal, 1921)
How To Stay Young (1933, 1940)

References

1876 births
1960 deaths
20th-century American physicians
American health and wellness writers
Anti-obesity activists
DePauw University alumni
Diet food advocates
Dietitians
Obesity researchers
New York College of Physicians and Surgeons alumni